Karpuzlu can refer to:

 Karpuzlu
 Karpuzlu, Ergani
 Karpuzlu, Kozluk
 Karpuzlu, Kulp
 Karpuzlu railway station